The Green Sheet was a bulletin regularly published by the Motion Picture Association of America between 1933 (shortly before the enforcement of the Motion Picture Production Code) and 1969 (shortly after the MPAA introduced its film rating system), providing recommendations about age-suitability for major motion pictures in theatrical release. Discontinued shortly after the official MPAA ratings began, the Green Sheet used classifications based upon a panel of reviewers that represented educational, psychological, and religious interest groups. Rather than providing a single classification for each film, the Green Sheet contained symbols representing a range of audiences for which the film seemed most appropriate. A classification would typically either list each age group (Example: Y-MY-A) or express suitability for all audiences.

During the late 1960s, the classifications were:

C - suitable for unaccompanied children
GA - suggested for general audiences
Y - suggested for young persons (junior high age) or older
MY - suggested for mature young persons (high school age) or older
A - aimed at adult audiences

Bulletins of the Green Sheet were initially for internal use only and exclusively included films approved by the PCA, but beginning in 1962 it appeared regularly in the periodical The Hollywood Reporter, while beginning in 1963 the Sheet began including films that didn't receive MPAA seals, which beginning in 1958 had made up a majority of all films released in the United States, which led many states to consider adopting mandatory ratings systems.

It is reasonable to suppose that the United States Film Production Code revisions of 1966, which created the label "SMA - Suggested for Mature Audiences," had the mature audience concept inspired by the application of the Green Sheet category MY (often expressed as MY-A). In addition, the original M rating (replaced by GP at the end of January, 1970) bore a resemblance to the green sheet category.

The MPAA effectively operated under a two-category classification system (either labeled SMA or containing no such label) from 1966 until Nov. 1, 1968 (when the official 4 category rating system was begun with the designations G, M, R, and X).

The Green Sheet advisory panel was not a part of the MPAA ratings board. Members could disagree on ratings, and the dissenting view could be listed in the bulletin. One instance included the film Support Your Local Sheriff, in which the appropriateness of "the cannon sequence" was at issue in provoking disagreement.

Some examples of late 1960s Green Sheet ratings include:
Chitty Chitty Bang Bang - C
Oliver! GA
Star! Y-MY-A
Anzio MY-A
Birds In Peru A

The recommendations were not necessarily made purely on the basis of the presence or basis of objectionable content, as a film such as 2001: A Space Odyssey could be designated as MY-A despite not having as much violent intensity as films such as Ice Station Zebra (Y-MY-A). There is not a clear match between MPAA ratings applied by CARA and the Green Sheet classifications. For example, G rated films like Popi or The Stalking Moon could receive Green Sheet designations as Mature or Adult films, while M or PG rated films such as The Lion in Winter could have Green Sheet designations suggesting appropriateness for young persons. There were also adult-classified Green Sheet entries that would receive G and M/PG equivalent ratings, such as Barbarella, which was rated PG in 1977.

History of film
Film censorship in the United States